The law of attraction is the New Thought spiritual belief that positive or negative thoughts bring positive or negative experiences into a person's life. The belief is based on the idea that people and their thoughts are made from "pure energy" and that like energy can attract like energy, thereby allowing people to improve their health, wealth, or personal relationships. There is no empirical scientific evidence supporting the law of attraction, and it is widely considered to be pseudoscience.

Advocates generally combine cognitive reframing techniques with affirmations and creative visualization to replace limiting or self-destructive ("negative") thoughts with more empowered, adaptive ("positive") thoughts. A key component of the philosophy is the idea that in order to effectively change one's negative thinking patterns, one must also "feel" (through creative visualization) that the desired changes have already occurred. This combination of positive thought and positive emotion is believed to allow one to attract positive experiences and opportunities by achieving resonance with the proposed energetic law.

Supporters of the law of attraction refer to scientific theories and use them as arguments in favor of it. However, it has no demonstrable scientific basis. A number of researchers have criticized the misuse of scientific concepts by its proponents.

History
The New Thought movement grew out of the teachings of Phineas Quimby in the early 19th century. Early in his life, Quimby was diagnosed with tuberculosis. Early 19th century medicine had no reliable cure for tuberculosis. Quimby took to horse riding and noted that intense excitement temporarily relieved him from his affliction. This method for relieving his pain and seemingly subsequent recovery prompted Phineas to pursue a study of "Mind over Body".  Although he never used the words "Law of Attraction", he explained this in a statement that captured the concept in the field of health: 

In 1855, the term "Law of Attraction" appeared in The Great Harmonia, written by the American spiritualist Andrew Jackson Davis, in a context alluding to the human soul and spheres of the afterlife.

The first articulator of the law of attraction as general principle was Prentice Mulford. Mulford, a pivotal figure in the development of New Thought thinking, discusses the law at length in his essay "The Law of Success", published 1886–1887. In this, Mulford was followed by other New Thought authors, such as Henry Wood (starting with his God's Image in Man, 1892), and Ralph Waldo Trine (starting with his first book, What All the World's A-Seeking, 1896). For these authors, the law of attraction is concerned not only about health but every aspect of life.

The 20th century saw a surge in interest in the subject with many books being written about it, amongst which are two of the best-selling books of all time; Think and Grow Rich (1937) by Napoleon Hill, The Power of Positive Thinking (1952) by Norman Vincent Peale, and You Can Heal Your Life (1984) by Louise Hay. The Abraham-Hicks material is based primarily around the law of attraction.

In 2006, the concept of the law of attraction gained renewed exposure with the release of the film The Secret (2006) which was then developed into a book of the same title in 2007. The movie and book gained widespread media coverage. This was followed by a sequel, The Power in 2010 that talks about the law of attraction being the law of love. The revived and modernized version of the law of attraction is known as manifestation.

Descriptions
Proponents believe that the law of attraction is always in operation and that it brings to each person the conditions and experiences that they predominantly think about, or which they desire or expect.

Charles Haanel wrote in The Master Key System (1912):

Ralph Trine wrote in In Tune With The Infinite (1897):

In her 2006 film The Secret, Rhonda Byrne emphasized thinking about what each person wants to obtain, but also to infuse the thought with the maximum possible amount of emotion. She claims the combination of thought and feeling is what attracts the desire. Another similar book is James Redfield's The Celestine Prophecy, which says reality can be manifested by man. The Power of Your Subconscious Mind by Joseph Murphy, says readers can achieve seemingly impossible goals by learning how to bring the mind itself under control. The Power by Rhonda Byrne and The Alchemist by Paulo Coelho are similar. While personal testimonies claim the secret and the law to have worked for them, a number of skeptics have criticized Byrne's film and book. The New York Times Book Review called the secret pseudoscience and an "illusion of knowledge".

Philosophical and religious basis
The New Thought concept of the law of attraction is rooted in ideas that come from various philosophical and religious traditions.  In particular, it has been inspired by Hermeticism, New England transcendentalism, specific verses from the Bible, and Hinduism.

Hermeticism influenced the development of European thought in the Renaissance. Its ideas were transmitted partly through alchemy. In the 18th century, Franz Mesmer studied the works of alchemists such as Paracelsus and van Helmont. Van Helmont was a 17th-century Flemish physician who proclaimed the curative powers of the imagination. This led Mesmer to develop his ideas about Animal magnetism which Phineas Quimby, the founder of New Thought, studied.

The Transcendentalist movement developed in the United States immediately before the emergence of New Thought and is thought to have had a great influence on it. George Ripley, an important figure in that movement, stated that its leading idea was "the supremacy of mind over matter".

New Thought authors often quote certain verses from the Bible in the context of the law of attraction. An example is Mark 11:24: "Therefore I tell you, whatever you ask in prayer, believe that you have received it, and it will be yours."

In the late 19th century Swami Vivekananda traveled to the United States and gave lectures on Hinduism. These talks greatly influenced the New Thought movement and in particular, William Walker Atkinson who was one of New Thought's pioneers.

Criticism

The law of attraction has been popularized in the early 21st century by books and films such as The Secret. This 2006 film and the subsequent book use interviews with New Thought authors and speakers to explain the principles of the proposed metaphysical law that one can attract anything that one thinks about consistently. Writing for the Committee for Skeptical Inquiry, Mary Carmichael and Ben Radford wrote that "neither the film nor the book has any basis in scientific reality", and that its premise contains "an ugly flipside: if you have an accident or disease, it's your fault".

Others have questioned the references to modern scientific theory, and have maintained, for example, that the law of attraction misrepresents the electrical activity of brainwaves. Victor Stenger and Leon Lederman are critical of attempts to use quantum mysticism to bridge any unexplained or seemingly implausible effects, believing these to be traits of modern pseudoscience.

Skeptical Inquirer magazine criticized the lack of falsifiability and testability of these claims. Critics have asserted that the evidence provided is usually anecdotal and that, because of the self-selecting nature of the positive reports, as well as the subjective nature of any results, these reports are susceptible to confirmation bias and selection bias. Physicist Ali Alousi, for instance, criticized it as unmeasurable and questioned the likelihood that thoughts can affect anything outside the head.

The mantra of The Secret, and by extension, the law of attraction, is as follows: positive thoughts and positive visualization will have a direct impact on the self. While positivity can improve one's quality of life and resilience through hardship, it can also be misguiding. Holding the belief that positive thinking will manifest positivity in one's life diminishes the value of hard work and perseverance, such as in the 1970s pursual of "self-esteem-based education".

Prominent supporters

 In 1891, Californian author and humorist Prentice Mulford used the term law of attraction in his essays Some Laws of Health and Beauty and Good And Ill Effects of Thought.
 In 1897, Ralph Waldo Trine wrote In Tune with the Infinite. In the second paragraph of chapter 9 he writes, "The Law of Attraction works unceasingly throughout the universe, and the one great and never changing fact in connection with it is, as we have found, that like attracts like."
 In 1902, English New Thought writer James Allen (best known for writing As a Man Thinketh) wrote a series of books and articles between 1901 and 1912, after which his wife Lily continued his work.
 In 1904, Thomas Troward, a strong influence in the New Thought Movement, gave a  lecture in which he claimed that thought precedes physical form and "the action of Mind plants that nucleus which, if allowed to grow undisturbed, will eventually attract to itself all the conditions necessary for its manifestation in outward visible form."
 In 1906, Emmet Fox wrote about metaphysics and the power of prayer in essays and books. His teachings are founded in Christianity and bible stories. He cites Jesus Christ as being the greatest teacher of metaphysics who ever lived and explains that thoughts are our most important emanation, more important than what we say or what we do. In the books Power Through Constructive Thinking and Find and Use your Inner Power Fox speaks about "building the mental equivalent of what you want and to expunge those that you don't".
In 1906, in his New Thought Movement book William Walker Atkinson used the phrase Thought Vibration or the Law of Attraction in the Thought World, stating that "like attracts like".
In 1907, Bruce MacLelland's Prosperity Through Thought Force, a prosperity theology book, summarizes the principle as "You are what you think, not what you think you are." It was published by Elizabeth Towne, the editor of The Nautilus Magazine, a Journal of New Thought.
 In his 1910 The Science of Getting Rich. Wallace D. Wattles espoused similar principles — that simply believing in the object of your desire and focusing on it will lead to that object or goal being realized on the material plane (Wattles claims in the Preface and later chapters of this book that his premise stems from the monistic Hindu view that God provides everything and can deliver what we focus on). The book also claims negative thinking will manifest negative results.
 In 1915, Theosophical author William Quan Judge used the phrase in The Ocean of Theosophy.
 In 1919, Another theosophical author Annie Besant discussed the 'Law of Attraction'. Besant compared her version of it to gravitation, and said that the law represented a form of karma.
 Napoleon Hill published two books on the theme. The first, The Law of Success in 16 Lessons (1928), directly and repeatedly references the Law of Attraction and proposes that it operates by use of radio waves transmitted by the brain. The second, Think and Grow Rich (1937), went on to sell 100 million copies by 2015. Hill insisted on the importance of controlling one's own thoughts in order to achieve success, as well as the energy that thoughts have and their ability to attract other thoughts. He mentions a "secret" to success and promises to indirectly describe it at least once in every chapter. It is never named and he says that discovering it on one's own is far more beneficial. Many people have argued over what it actually is; some claim it is the law of Attraction. Hill states the "secret" is mentioned no fewer than a hundred times, yet reference to "attract" is used less than 30 times in the text.
 Israel Regardie published books with the law of attraction theme as one of his prevailing Universal Laws. In, The Art of True Healing: A Treatise on the Mechanism of Prayer and the Operation of the Law of Attraction in Nature (1937), he taught a focused meditation technique to help the mind to learn to heal itself on a physical and spiritual level. Regardie claimed that the law of attraction was a valid method for attracting good physical health and for improvement in any aspect of one's life.
 In 1960, W. Clement Stone and Napoleon Hill co-wrote Success Through a Positive Mental Attitude.
 In his 1988 The American Myth of Success, Richard Weiss states that the principle of "non-resistance" is a popular concept of the New Thought movement and is taught in conjunction with the law of attraction.
 The 2008, Esther and Jerry Hicks' book Money and the Law of Attraction: Learning to Attract Health, Wealth & Happiness appeared on the New York Times Best Seller list.
 Rhonda Byrne, author of The Secret, The Power and The Magic, was influenced by Wattles' The Science of Getting Rich.
 Norman Vincent Peale

See also

 List of New Thought writers
 Conversations with God
 Cosmic ordering
 Efficacy of prayer
 Homophily
 Internal locus of control
 It's a Good Life
 Kybalion
 Law of contagion
 Magical thinking
 Medical students' disease
 Mind over matter
 Positive mental attitude
 Priming (psychology)
 Prosperity theology
 Pygmalion effect
 Quantum mysticism
 Self-fulfilling prophecy
 Sympathetic magic

References

External links

New Thought beliefs
Quantum mysticism
New Age
Magical thinking